Segart is a town in the autonomous community of Valencia, Spain, belonging to the province of Valencia in the comarca of Camp de Morvedre. Until the mid-20th century, it was called Segart of Albalat.

Economy 
Economy is traditionally based on agriculture, with  cultivation of olives, almonds, carob and vine. Irrigated areas grow    oranges. Livestock include sheep.

Main sights 
Hermitage of Segart
Parish church, dedicated to the Immaculate Conception. 
 Segart Castle, of Moorish (13th century) origins, conquered by James I of Aragon. It is   situated atop a hill.
El Garbí panoramic point ov view.

References

External links 
 Instituto Valenciano de Estadística
 Castillo de Segart

Municipalities in the Province of Valencia
Camp de Morvedre